Thatcheria liratula is an extinct species of sea snail, a marine gastropod mollusk in the family Raphitomidae.

Description

Distribution
Fossils of this marine species were found in Lower Pliocene strata in New Zealand

References

 Powell, A. W. B. 1942. The New Zealand Recent and fossil Mollusca of the family Turridae, with general notes on Turrid nomenclature and systematics. Bull. Auckland Inst., 2 : 1–188, pis. 1–14.
 Maxwell, P.A. (2009). Cenozoic Mollusca. pp 232–254 in Gordon, D.P. (ed.) New Zealand inventory of biodiversity. Volume one. Kingdom Animalia: Radiata, Lophotrochozoa, Deuterostomia. Canterbury University Press, Christchurch

External links
 A.J. Charig, The Gastropod Genus Thatcheria and its Relationships; Bulletin of the British Museum (Natural History), vol.  7 # 9 (1963)

liratula
Gastropods described in 1942
Gastropods of New Zealand